Institute of Manuscripts, named after Muhammad Fuzuli, is a scientific centre of Azerbaijan National Academy of Sciences and this center is engaged in scientific-research, archive and library science activities, realizes collection, systematization, security, study, translation and publication of medieval manuscripts. Institute is located in a historical building of the former Empress Alexandra Russian Muslim Boarding School for Girls established by H.Z.Taghiyev on Istiglaliyyat Street.

Guidance

Director of the Institute:

Academician Teymur Kerimli

Deputy Directors:

Pasha Karimov - Deputy Director for Science

Aybeniz Aliyeva-Kangarli - Deputy Director for Science

Gurban Gumbatov - Deputy Director for General Affairs

Scientific Secretary:

Candidate of philological sciences Azizaga Nadjafov

Directions of action:

History
Prerequisites for foundation of the Institute appeared even in 1924, when the All-Azerbaijani Regional Congress was held in Baku, at which it was enacted to organize scientific library with a special department dedicated to ancient manuscripts and rare books. Initially, the library was a part of Research Union of Azerbaijan, but later it was included to the Literature Institution named after Nizami. In 1950, Republican Manuscript Foundation was established under the National Academy of Sciences of Azerbaijan. In 1986, the Institute of Manuscripts of the National Academy of Sciences of Azerbaijan was established on the basis of this foundation. In 1996, the Institute was named after Muhammad Fuzuli.

The Institute of Manuscripts has  rich and rare manuscripts collection covering all fields of the medieval sciences - medicine and astronomy, mathematics and mineralogy, poetics and philosophy, theology and law, grammar, history and geography, prose and poetry in Azerbaijani, Turkish, Arabic, Persian and other languages.

There are more than 40,000 materials were collected in the Institute of Manuscripts, of which about 12,000 are arabographic manuscripts that were written or rewritten in the  IX—XX centuries. In addition, the institute has preserved personal documents of prominent figures of science and literature of Azerbaijan, who lived in the XIX-XX centuries, historical documents, old printed books, newspapers and magazines of previous periods, microfilms and photographs. The oldest manuscript in the Institute of Manuscripts is Surah An-Nisa written on parchment in the IX century.

The copies of works such as “Medical Laws” of Abu Ali Ibn Sina, “About Surgery and surgical tools” and “The thirtieth treatise” of Abul-Gasim az-Zahravi, “Food-stuffs of Nizamshah”, “Gulshani-raz” of Sheikh Mahmoud Shabustari, “Divan” of Nasimi, “Bustan” of Sadi copied in the XII-XV centuries are the most ancient manuscripts preserved at the Institute of Manuscripts.

The first native monuments are of special importance among those protected in the Institute of Manuscripts. The most valuable manuscript copies works such as “Varga and Gulsha” written by Yusif Maddah, “Yusif and Zuleykha” by Suli Fagih are maintaintedin the Institute.

During  2005–2017 years 4 of Azerbaijan manuscripts included in “Memory of the World” Register of UNESCO.

Since January 2015 the Institute of Manuscripts named after Muhammad Fuzuli of Azerbaijan National Academy of Sciences is a member of the Association of International Islamic Manuscripts which was established at the British Cambridge University. (TIMA)

Structure
At present, in the Institute of Manuscripts named after Muhammad Fuzuli there are 11 departments and a laboratory.

Scientific-research departments:

- Department of research of Turkish manuscripts;

- Department of research of Arabian manuscripts;

- Department of research of Persian manuscripts;

- Department of research of personal archives;

- Department of bibliology and bibliography;

- Department of multidisciplinary and published books;

- Department of international relations;

- Department of electronic resources;

- Department of scientific funds;

- Department of library and scientific information;

Scientific-research laboratory:

- Laboratory of hygiene and restoration.

Other departments:

- Department of education;

- Department of public relations;

- Accounting;

- Department of human resources;

- Common department;

The Institute of Manuscripts is engaged in collecting, systematizing, preserving, cataloguing, digitalizing, bibliographizing, researching, introducing, promoting and publishing the material samples (Turkish, Persian, Arabic manuscripts, lithographical books, historical-archeological documents, personal archives ) of the literary and scientific-social thought of Azerbaijan that we attain.

References

http://manuscript.az/

1986 establishments in Azerbaijan
1986 establishments in the Soviet Union
Research institutes established in 1986
Research institutes in Azerbaijan
Research institutes in the Soviet Union